The American Angora Goat Breeders' Association is the only American breed registry for the Angora goat. Established in 1900, the association is headquartered in Rocksprings, Texas.

External links 
 Official Homepage
 Colored Angora Goat Breeders Association
 University of California Davis bibliography
 US Internal Revenue Service listing

Agricultural organizations based in the United States
Breed registries
Edwards County, Texas
1900 establishments in Texas